RBTI may refer to:

Ralph Breaks the Internet, a 2018 American computer-animated comedy film
Rede Brasileira de Televisão Internacional, an international Brazilian television network.